The 2002 Kentucky Derby was the 128th running of the Kentucky Derby. The race took place on May 4, 2002, and 145,033 people were in attendance. The race was won by War Emblem who led from start to finish.

Race description
The field was considered evenly matched, especially after the scratch of Buddha, who had won the Wood Memorial. The favorite was Harlan's Holiday, who had won both the Florida Derby and Blue Grass Stakes. He went off at odds of 6-1, then the longest starting price for a favorite in Derby history. Medaglia d'Oro and Saarland, who had finished second and fourth in the Wood Memorial respectively, went off at odds of 7-1.

War Emblem was a relative longshot at odds of 20-1, despite having won the Illinois Derby in frontrunning fashion on April 6. Shortly after that race, he was purchased by The Thoroughbred Corporation (owned by Saudi Prince Ahmed Salman) and was put into training with Bob Baffert. Baffert trained the colt aggressively to build up his stamina, and quipped, "If this horse wins the Derby, it will be the best and shortest training job ever."

As expected, War Emblem went to the early lead, running the first quarter-mile in 23.25 seconds and the half in :47.04. Jockey Victor Espinoza was then able to slow down the pace slightly as the colt maintained a lead of  lengths down the backstretch and around the final turn. In the final furlong, War Emblem opened up his lead to four lengths under a hand ride. Espinoza said that he knew no one could catch them as the colt had been moving so easily. He completed the  miles in 2:01.13, then the seventh fastest Derby in history. Another longshot, Proud Citizen, finished second, resulting in an exacta payout of $1,300.80 for a $2 bet.

Results

Scratched: Buddha, Danthebluegrassman

Source: Equibase Chart

Payout
The 128th Kentucky Derby Payout Schedule

 $2 Exacta: (5-13)  Paid   $1,300.80
 $2 Trifecta: (5-13-3)  Paid   $18,373.20
 $1 Superfecta: (5-13-3-9)  Paid   $91,764.50

Subsequent racing careers
Several horses went on to record Grade I wins:
 War Emblem – Preakness Stakes, Haskell Invitational
 Perfect Drift – 2003 Stephen Foster Handicap
 Medaglia d'Oro – Travers Stakes, 2003 Whitney Handicap, 2004 Donn Handicap
 Request for Parole – 2004 United Nations Stakes
 Came Home – Pacific Classic
 Harlan's Holiday – 2003 Donn Handicap

Subsequent breeding careers
Medaglia d'Oro
 Rachel Alexandra – 2009 Horse of the Year. Preakness Stakes, Kentucky Oaks, Haskell Invitational, Woodward Stakes
 Songbird – 2015 Breeders' Cup Juvenile Fillies, 2016 Kentucky Oaks, Santa Anita Oaks, Coaching Club American Oaks
 Plum Pretty – 2011 Kentucky Oaks, Cotillion, 2012 Apple Blossom
 Vancouver – 2015 Golden Slipper
 Talismanic - 2016 Breeders' Cup Turf

Harlan's Holiday
 Shanghai Bobby – Breeders' Cup Juvenile, Hopeful Stakes, Champagne Stakes
 Into Mischief – CashCall Futurity

Johannesburg
 Scat Daddy – Champagne Stakes, Florida Derby
 Strapping Groom – Forego Stakes

Essence of Dubai
 Dubai Majesty – Breeders' Cup Filly & Mare Sprint

Sources: American Classic Pedigrees, Equibase, Blood-Horse Stallion Register, Racing Post

References

2002
Kentucky Derby
Derby
May 2002 sports events in the United States